Srabonti Narmeen Ali  is a Bangladeshi writer and singer. In 2011, she released her first solo album written and composed by both her and Shayan Chowdhury Arnob. Her singles include "Amaro Porano", "O.E.Z." and "Cold and Sentimental".

Music

Srabonti has been a student of music from the age of three. She started training in Rabindra Sangeet with renowned singer Banani Ghosh when she was eight and continued training with other renowned singers such as Papia Sarwar, Sadi Mohammad and her own mother, Milia Ali. Simultaneously she was training in Indian classical music and learning choral and Broadway music at school and participating in various international inter-scholastic music and drama festivals all over South Asia.

She was a member of the Bryn Mawr and Haverford A Capella group The Looney Tunes while she was in college. When she moved back to Bangladesh she released a duet Rabindra Sangeet album with her mother in 2004 called Cholay Jai Din. She also released her first single, Ghumiye Thakai Bhalo in singer and songwriter's compiled production of new artists, Jhalmurri in 2007. In 2010 she was an assistant music producer for the motion picture Jaago and also sang in one of the movie's hit songs, Kano Chole Gele Dure. In 2011 Srabonti released her first solo album with both Bengali and English songs written and composed by both her and Shayan Chowdhury Arnob.

She currently has a number of single tracks out such as Amaro Porano, by Zaeed Zubair and O.E.Z. and Cold and Sentimental by Misha Ali (Sapient Ape).

Writing

Srabonti is a member of Writers Block, a group of Bangladeshi-based writers who write in English. The first chapter of her novel, Hope in Technicolor, was published in  What the Ink, which came out in 2011 at the Hay Festival Dhaka. Her short story, Yellow Cab, was published in  the Anthology, Lifelines, and came out in November 2012 at the  Hay Festival. Her short story, Midnight in March was published in the e-journal, Urban Confusions, Issue 3, in 2013. Her short story The Seven Year Itch was published in The Six Seasons Review in November 2013 at the Hay Festival. Her novel, Hope in Technicolor, was published in November 2013 at the Hay Festival, 2013. She is currently working on her second novel. In 2019 she published her another novel Broken Voice.

References

1979 births
Living people
Alumni of King's College London
Bangladeshi women writers
21st-century Bangladeshi women singers
21st-century Bangladeshi singers
Bryn Mawr College alumni